Them is an American online LGBT magazine launched in October 2017 by Phillip Picardi and owned by Condé Nast. Its coverage includes LGBT culture, fashion, and politics.

History 
In 2017 Picardi, then the director of Teen Vogue, proposed to Anna Wintour, Condé Nast's artistic director, that the company create an online, LGBT-focused media platform. Founding editors included Meredith Talusan, Tyler Ford, and James Clarizio, and launch partners included Burberry, Google, Lyft, and GLAAD. 

Upon the website's launch, there was some controversy over its naming, which some considered to be "othering". The name is derived from the singular them pronoun, emphasizing a gender neutral approach including in its fashion coverage. 

Picardi left Them and Condé Nast in the fall of 2018 to begin working as editor-in-chief of Out magazine. Whembley Sewell was named the new executive editor in 2019. In October 2021, Sarah Burke became the new editor-in-chief of Them.

In 2020, Them hosted two virtual Pride Month events, Themfest and Out Now Live. Out Now Live, its June 2020 virtual gay pride event, included speeches, LGBT history and musical performances. It was produced in collaboration with Pitchfork.

See also 
 Metro Weekly
 The Advocate
 Bi Women Quarterly
 List of LGBT periodicals

References

External links 
 

Condé Nast websites
LGBT-related magazines published in the United States
LGBT-related websites
LGBT-related newspapers published in the United States
Online magazines published in the United States
2017 establishments in the United States
Magazines established in 2017
Internet properties established in 2017